is a passenger railway station  located in the city of  Takarazuka Hyōgo Prefecture, Japan. It is operated by the private transportation company Hankyu Railway.

Lines

Layout
The station consists of two opposed elevated side platforms, with the station building underneath.

Platforms

Adjacent stations

History
Takarazuka-Minamiguchi Station opened on September 2, 1921.

Passenger statistics
In fiscal 2019, the station was used by an average of 12,769 passengers daily

Surrounding area
Takarazuka Hotel
Takarazuka Music School
Takarazuka Grand Theater, Takarazuka Bow Hall
The Osamu Tezuka Manga Museum
Mukogawa River

See also
List of railway stations in Japan

References

External links

 Takarazuka-Minamiguchi Station (Hankyu Railway) 

Railway stations in Hyōgo Prefecture
Hankyu Railway Imazu Line
Stations of Hankyu Railway
Railway stations in Japan opened in 1921
Takarazuka, Hyōgo